"The Naming of the Dead" is a 2007 episode of STV's
Rebus television series. It was the third episode broadcast in the show's fourth season, and starred Ken Stott in the title role. 
The episode was based on the Ian Rankin novel of the same name.

Plot
When a body is found at the site of a top-level conference in Edinburgh, Rebus falls foul of Steelforth, the Special Branch officer leading the protection detail. Later, one of the delegates falls to his death, and Steelforth is keen to have this dismissed as suicide. Rebus finds a link between the second man, a government minister, and an industrialist, Pennen. He also forms  a relationship with Stacey Webster, the sister of the second victim. Rebus is determined to uncover the truth, suspecting wrongdoing in high places and a cover-up.
However the truth behind the two deaths is revealed to be both simpler and closer to home.

Cast
Ken Stott as DI John Rebus
Claire Price as DS Siobhan Clarke
Nicholas Jones as Commander Steelforth
Julie Graham as Stacey Webster
Paul Antony-Barber as Richard Pennen

Footnotes

External links 

2007 British television episodes
Rebus (TV series) episodes